Andrew Shaw Goudie (born 21 August 1945, in Cheltenham) is a geographer at the University of Oxford specialising in desert geomorphology, dust storms, weathering, and climatic change in the tropics. He is also known for his teaching and best-selling textbooks on human impacts on the environment. He is the author, co-author, editor, or co-editor of forty-one books (many of which have appeared in numerous editions) and more than two hundred papers published in learned journals. He combines research and some teaching with administrative roles.

Career 
Andrew Goudie was at the School of Geography and the Environment, University of Oxford from 1970 to 2003. He was appointed fellow of Hertford College in 1976, was professor of geography in 1984 and was head of the School of Geography from 1984 until 1994. From 1995 until 1997, he was president of the Oxford Development Programme and pro-vice-chancellor of the university. He was master of St Cross College, Oxford. from 2003 to 2011. He has been an honorary secretary and vice president of the Royal Geographical Society, executive secretary and chairman of the British Geomorphical Research Group, a member of the council of the Institute of British Geographers, and president of the Geographical Association. He has also been president of the International Association of Geomorphologists.

In 1970, Goudie was elected a Member of the Institute of British Geographers (of which he was later a member of council) and a Fellow of the Royal Geographical Society. He was honorary secretary of the Royal Geographical Society from 1980 until 1988 and has been a vice-president of the Society. He has been president of the Geographical Association and of the International Association of Geomorphologists and has served as a delegate to Oxford University Press.

Publications 
 Andrew S. Goudie, Geomorphology in the Anthropocene (Cambridge University Press, 2017)
 Andrew S. Goudie, Great Desert Explorers (Silphum Press, Royal Geographical Society, 2016)
 Andrew S. Goudie, Wheels Across The Desert: Exploration Of The Libyan Desert By Motorcar 1916-1942 (Silphum Press, The Society for Libyan Studies, 2008)
 David E. Anderson, Andrew S. Goudie, and Adrian G. Parker, Global Environments through the Quaternary: Exploring Environmental Change (4th edn, Oxford University Press, 2007).
 Andrew S. Goudie and N.J. Middleton, Desert Dust in the Global System (Heidelberg: Springer, 2006), article abstract,)
 Andrew S. Goudie, The Human Impact On The Natural Environment: Past, Present, And Future (Oxford: Blackwell, 1981; 2nd edn 1986; 3rd edn 1990; 4th edn 1993; 5th edn 2000; 6th edn 2006)
 Andrew S. Goudie, ed., Encyclopedia of Geomorphology (London: Routledge, 2004).
 Andrew S. Goudie, editor-in-chief, and David J. Cuff, associate editor, Encyclopedia of Global Change: Environmental Change and Human Society (Oxford University Press, 2002)
 Andrew S. Goudie, Great Warm Deserts of the World: Landscapes and Evolution (Oxford University Press, 2002)
 Andrew S. Goudie, The Nature Of The Environment (Oxford: Blackwell, 1984; 2nd edn 1989; 3rd edn 1993; 4th edn 2001)
 David S.G. Thomas and Andrew Goudie, eds, The Dictionary Of Physical Geography (Oxford: Blackwell, 1985; 2nd edn 1994; 3rd edn 2000)
 Andrew S. Goudie, Ian Livingstone, and Stephen Stokes, eds, Aeolian Environments, Sediments, and Landforms (Chichester: Wiley, 1999)
 Andrew S. Goudie and Bilin Neyapti, Conflict and Growth in Africa, Vol. 3, Southern Africa (Paris: Development Centre of the Organisation for Economic Co-operation and Development, 1999)
 Denys Brunsden and Andrew S. Goudie, Classic Landforms of the West Dorset Coast (Sheffield: Geographical Association, 1997; new edn 1997)
 Andrew S. Goudie, Climate (London: Phoenix, 1997)
 Andrew S. Goudie and Heather Viles, The Earth Transformed: An Introduction To Human Impacts On The Environment (Oxford: Blackwell, 1997)
 Andrew S. Goudie, ed., The Human Impact Reader: Readings and Case Studies (Oxford: Blackwell, 1997)
 Andrew S. Goudie and Heather A. Viles, Salt Weathering Hazards (Chichester: Wiley, 1997)
 W.M. Adams, Andrew S. Goudie and A.R. Orme, eds, The Physical Geography of Africa (Oxford University Press, 1996)
 Andrew Goudie and Adrian Parker, The Geomorphology of the Cotswolds (Oxford: Cotteswold Naturalists' Field Club, 1996)
 Andrew S. Goudie, The Changing Earth: Rates of Geomorphological Pprocesses (Oxford: Blackwell, 1995)
 Andrew S. Goudie, Deserts in a Warmer World (Chichester: Wiley, 1994)
 Andrew S. Goudie and Denys Brunsden, The Environment of the British Isles: An Atlas (Oxford: Clarendon Press, 1994)
 Andrew S. Goudie et al., eds, Geomorphological Techniques (London: Unwin Hyman, 1990; 2nd edn, London: Routledge, 1994)
 Ron Cooke, Andrew Warren, and Andrew S. Goudie, Desert Geomorphology (London: UCL Press, 1993)
 Andrew S. Goudie and Rita Gardner, Discovering Landscape in England & Wales (London: Allen & Unwin, 1985; 2nd edn, London: Chapman & Hall, 1992)
 Andrew S. Goudie, Environmental Change (Oxford: Clarendon Press, 1977; 2nd edn 1983; 3rd edn 1992)
 Alisdair Rogers, Heather Viles, and Andrew S. Goudie, eds, The Student's Companion to Geography (Oxford: Blackwell, 1992)
 Andrew S. Goudie and Andrew Watson, Desert Geomorphology (Basingstoke: Macmillan Education, 1980; 2nd edn 1990)
 Andrew S. Goudie, The Landforms of England and Wales (Oxford: Basil Blackwell, 1990)
 Andrew S. Goudie, ed., Techniques for Desert Reclamation (Chichester: Wiley, 1990)
 J.T. Harmse, P.G. Olivier, and Andrew S. Goudie, eds, A Bibliography on Pans and Related Deposits (Johannesburg: University Press, Rand Afrikaans University, 1990)
 Andrew S. Goudie, The search for Timbuktu: A View of Deserts: An Inaugural Lecture Delivered Before the University of Oxford on 25 October 1985 (Oxford: Clarendon Press, 1986)
 Andrew S. Goudie, Salt Weathering (Oxford: University of Oxford School of Geography, 1985)
 Andrew S. Goudie, ed., Seven Hundred Years of an Oxford College: Hertford College, 1284–1984 (Oxford: Hertford College, 1984)
 Andrew S. Goudie and D. Price Williams, The Atlas of Swaziland (Lobamba: Swaziland National Trust Commission, 1983)
 Andrew S. Goudie and Kenneth Pye, eds, Chemical Sediments and Geomorphology: Precipitates and Residua in the Near-Surface Environment (London: Academic Press, 1983)
 Denys Brunsden and Andrew S. Goudie, Classic Coastal Landforms of Dorset (Sheffield: Geographical Association, 1981)
 Bridget Allchin, Andrew S. Goudie, and Karunarkara Hegde, The Prehistory and Palaeogeography of the Great Indian Desert (London; New York: Academic Press, 1978)
 Andrew S. Goudie and John Wilkinson, The Warm Desert Environment (Cambridge: Cambridge University Press, 1977)
 Andrew S. Goudie, The Concept of Post-glacial Progressive Desiccation (Oxford: School of Geography, University of Oxford, 1972)
 Andrew S. Goudie, Duricrusts in Tropical and Subtropical Landscapes (Oxford: Clarendon Press, 1973)

Awards 
 2007 Geological Society of America's Farouk El-Baz Award for Desert Research
 2002 Medal from the Royal Academy of Belgium
 2002 DSc awarded by the University of Oxford
 1991 Founders' Medal of the Royal Geographical Society
 1991 Mungo Park Medal by the Royal Scottish Geographical Society

Education 
Goudie was educated at Dean Close School and Trinity Hall, Cambridge (BA first class with distinction 1967, MA, PhD 1972). In 2002 he was awarded the degree of Doctor of Science by the University of Oxford.

References

External links 
 Oxford Inspires
 School of Geography (includes more extensive list of publications)
 St Cross College, Oxford
 Debrett's People of Today (12th edn, London, 1999), p. 767

1945 births
Living people
People educated at Dean Close School
Alumni of Trinity Hall, Cambridge
Masters of St Cross College, Oxford
People from Cheltenham
Process geomorphologists
English geographers
Pro-Vice-Chancellors of the University of Oxford
British geomorphologists